Chelae or Chelai, also called Philemporos, was a town of ancient Thrace on the Bosphorus, inhabited during Roman and Byzantine times. 

Its site is located near Bebek in European Turkey.

References

Populated places in ancient Thrace
Former populated places in Turkey
Roman towns and cities in Turkey
Populated places of the Byzantine Empire
History of Istanbul Province